Johnny Stool Pigeon is a 1949 American film noir crime film directed by William Castle and starring Howard Duff, Shelley Winters and Dan Duryea.

Plot
A narcotics agent convinces a convict he helped send to Alcatraz go undercover with him to help expose a heroin drug smuggling ring.  The unlikely pair travels from San Francisco to Vancouver and finally to a dude ranch in Tucson which is run by mob bosses. They end up getting help breaking the case from the gang leader's girlfriend (Winters), who falls for the narcotics agent during the sting.

Cast
 Howard Duff as George Morton aka Mike Doyle 
 Shelley Winters as Terry 
 Dan Duryea as Johnny Evans 
 Tony Curtis as Joey Hyatt (as Anthony Curtis)
 John McIntire as Avery
 Gar Moore as Sam Harrison
 Leif Erickson as Pringle
 Barry Kelley as McCandles
 Hugh Reilly as Charlie
 Wally Maher as Benson

Production
The film was known as Contraband and Partners in Crime.

It was William Castle's first movie at Universal. He called it "a pedestrian thriller" whose only claim to fame was featuring Tony Curtis and Shelley Winters in the cast.

Reception

When the film was released, the film critic for The New York Times, gave the film a tepid review, writing, "Despite a serious attempt at authenticity it is merely a brisk cops-and-smugglers melodrama, which follows an obvious pattern and is fairly strong on suspense and short on originality and impressive histrionics ... Howard Duff, who has had plenty of experience as a gumshoe both on the radio and in films, is appropriately self-effacing, hard and handsome as the intrepid agent. Dan Duryea adds a surprising twist to his usual characterizations of tough hombres as the convict who turns on his own kind, and Shelley Winters gives a credible performance as the blonde moll who also gives the law a much-needed assist. But aside from a few variations their crime and punishment adventures are cast in a familiar mold."

See also
 List of American films of 1949

References

External links
 
 
 

1949 films
1949 crime drama films
American crime drama films
American black-and-white films
Film noir
Films set in San Francisco
Universal Pictures films
Films directed by William Castle
1940s English-language films
1940s American films